Archaruni was a region and family of the old Armenia c. 400–800.

The ruler about 445 was Varhan Archaruni; and in 451 was Archavir Archaruni.

See also
List of regions of old Armenia

Early medieval Armenian regions